Goverdhan Lal Jamnalal Oza (born 12 December 1924, date of death unknown), often shortened to G. L. Oza, was an Indian judge, independence activist and Justice of the Supreme Court of India.

Early life
Oza was born in December 1924 in Ujjain, British India. His father Shri Jamnalalji Oza was a social worker of Ujjain. Oza passed from Government Madhav Arts and Commerce College, Ujjain. In the student life he took active part in student politics and Quit India movement led by Mahatma Gandhi. He joined the agitation against the rulers of the Holkar State for the merger of the State in the Indian Union at the time of Indian Independence.

Career
In 1948 he started his lawyer career in Indore Court. He attended the Asian Socialist Conference at Rangoon, Burma in December 1952 as an India delegate. He practiced on Civil, Criminal and Constitutional matters. Oza was active political activist and worked in various important and political cases at Indore before elevation to the Bench. He became the Additional Judge of the Madhya Pradesh High Court at Jabalpur on 29 July 1968. On 3 January 1984 Justice Oza was appointed as Acting Chief Justice of Madhya Pradesh High Court and in December 1984 he became the permanent Chief Justice of the same High Court. He was elevated in the post of Additional Judge of the Supreme Court of India on 29 October 1985 and retired on 11 December 1989.

Personal life
In March 2003, it was noted that Oza was deceased.

References

1924 births
Year of death missing
20th-century Indian judges
21st-century Indian judges
Chief Justices of the Madhya Pradesh High Court
Gandhians
Indian independence activists from  Madhya Pradesh
Indian judges
Justices of the Supreme Court of India
People from Ujjain district